Baron Grod is the first [self-]released album by Austin, TX band, Baron Grod.  It was released on October 1, 2008.

Track listing

Personnel
 Ryoko Minowa - keyboards, vocals
 Cody Schibi − drums
 David Finner − guitar, vocals
 Lance Schibi - bass, vocals
 Cody Schibi & Lance Schibi − album design

2008 albums